Edimilson Fernandes Ribeiro (born 15 April 1996) is a Swiss professional footballer who plays as an attacking midfielder for German club Mainz 05 and the Switzerland national team.

Club career

Sion
Fernandes is a youth exponent from FC Sion. He made his Swiss Super League debut on 1 June 2013 against FC Zürich in 4–2 home win. He started in the first eleven and was substituted after 53 minutes. He scored his first senior goal on 1 March 2015 in a 2–2 draw at home to FC Luzern. Fernandes played every minute of Sion's 2015–16 Europa League campaign before the side was knocked out by Braga in the last 32. In all games, he played 65 times for Sion's first team and 41 games for the club's under-21 side.

West Ham United
On 25 August 2016, Fernandes signed a four-year deal with English club West Ham United for a fee of £5 million. He made his West Ham debut on 25 September 2016 in a 3–0 home defeat by Southampton, coming on as an 82nd-minute substitute for Mark Noble. On 26 October 2016, Fernandes scored his first goal for West Ham in a 2–1 win against Chelsea in the EFL Cup, winning praise from manager Slaven Bilić.

Loan to Fiorentina
On 13 August 2018, Fernandes joined Italian side Fiorentina on a one-year loan deal with an option to buy.

Mainz 05
On 3 June 2019, Fernandes joined Bundesliga side Mainz 05 on a four-year deal for an undisclosed fee. On 17 August 2019, he made his full debut for the club in the league season opener against SC Freiburg, starting and playing 84 minutes of a 3–0 loss while picking up a first-half yellow card.

Fernandes scored his first goal for Mainz in the penultimate Bundesliga game of the 2019–2020 season. After being substituted on in the second half, he scored the third goal in Mainz's 3–1 win over Werder Bremen.

Loan to Young Boys
On 15 February 2022, Fernandes moved on loan to Young Boys until the end of the season.

International career
Fernandes made his debut for the Switzerland under-21 team in March 2016 in a 1–1 draw with England. In his second game, on 2 September 2016, he scored his first international goal in a 3–0 win against Kazakhstan in Biel/Bienne.

In November 2016, Fernandes received his first call-up to the senior Switzerland squad for a match against the Faroe Islands.

He made his senior debut against them, coming off the bench in the 69th minute.

In May 2019, he played in 2019 UEFA Nations League Finals, where his team finished fourth.

In 2021, he was called up to the national team for the 2020 UEFA European Championship, where the team created one of the main sensations of the tournament reaching the quarter-finals.

Personal life
Fernandes was born in Sion, Switzerland, of Portuguese and Cape Verdean descent. He is the cousin of Swiss international footballer Gelson Fernandes, Portuguese international footballer Manuel Fernandes and ex-Sunderland midfielder Cabral.

Career statistics

Club

International goals
Scores and results list Switzerland's goal tally first, score column indicates score after each Fernandes goal.

Honours 
Sion
Swiss Cup: 2014–15

References

External links

Profile at the 1. FSV Mainz 05 website 

1996 births
Living people
People from Sion, Switzerland
Swiss men's footballers
Switzerland under-21 international footballers
Switzerland international footballers
Association football midfielders
FC Sion players
West Ham United F.C. players
ACF Fiorentina players
1. FSV Mainz 05 players
Arminia Bielefeld players
BSC Young Boys players
Swiss Super League players
Premier League players
Serie A players
Bundesliga players
UEFA Euro 2020 players
2022 FIFA World Cup players
Swiss expatriate footballers
Expatriate footballers in England
Expatriate footballers in Germany
Expatriate footballers in Italy
Swiss expatriate sportspeople in England
Swiss expatriate sportspeople in Germany
Swiss expatriate sportspeople in Italy
Swiss people of Cape Verdean descent
Swiss sportspeople of African descent
Swiss people of Portuguese descent
Sportspeople from Valais